Billy & Mandy's Big Boogey Adventure is a 2007 made-for-television animated adventure fantasy comedy film produced by Cartoon Network Studios, and is the first made-for-television film based on the animated series The Grim Adventures of Billy & Mandy, the second being Billy & Mandy: Wrath of the Spider Queen. Big Boogey Adventure premiered in the United States on March 30, 2007, and in the UK on February 14, 2007, and was released on DVD in the U.S. on April 3, 2007.

The events of the film take place during the seventh and final season of The Grim Adventures of Billy & Mandy.

Plot 
In the future, in a dystopian Endsville, an evil being known as the "Lord of Horror" orders his henchmen to go back in time to eliminate Billy and Mandy and prevent them from reaching a powerful hand-like artifact in the Lord of Horror's possession before his past self does. Billy and Irwin of this time hope their past selves can stop the Lord of Horror's evil plans.

Two weeks prior, Grim is sued for dereliction of duty and misuse of his abilities by his old rival, the Boogey Man, the former having failed to reap General Skarr (who had accidentally created a hole in his chest) thanks to an intervention from Billy and Mandy. Grim and the children (including Irwin) are set to be exiled by the Underworld Court and placed in the custody of Boogey, with Grim being stripped of his job and powers and Numbuh 3 of Codename: Kids Next Door becoming his court-appointed replacement. Boogey reveals it was part of his plan to steal Horror's Hand, an artifact capable of bringing people's deepest fears to life and transforming anyone who conquers their fear into the scariest and most powerful being in existence; Boogey himself believes that with its power, children will fear him again. The group eventually escapes and plans to obtain the hand for themselves for various reasons (Grim believes it will get him his job back, Mandy sees it as the way to conquer the world, Irwin thinks it will help him win Mandy's heart and Billy just wants to use it to get a candy bar).

Both groups eventually reach where the hand is held, where they meet Horror the Ancient (guest star George Segal), a living statue that cut off the hand -originally his left hand- having placed his fears within it in an attempt to make himself brave. To obtain the hand, the two rivaling groups must embark on a race across the Cannibal Run - the most dangerous section of the River Styx - as well as facing their worst fears. Grim and the children win and scrape to obtain the hand. Billy, Irwin and Mandy are easily subdued by their respective worst nightmares (a spider-clown-mailman hybrid, telling jokes to wild bears and growing up into a cheerful woman married to Irwin), leaving Grim to claim the hand unaffected, revealing he goes through his worst nightmare every day — being forced to live with Billy and Mandy. The hand however is almost immediately stolen by Boogey (who uses it to scare Grim to pieces, though Grim actually blew himself up on purpose). Believing he has won, Boogey turns out to be incapable of facing his worst fear, realizing that he is not at all scary (Grim actually turned the hand's power off right after he picked it up, meaning Boogey wasn't ever scary at all). He suffers amnesia after a series of accidents and ends up afraid of everything. Mistaking Fred Fredburger's comments about nachos (specifically that "if [he'd] never eaten them, [he] wouldn't have known he could finish them all" - he had swallowed a cannonball prior) for actual philosophical advice, Billy has an epiphany that he and his friends obtained what they wanted all along without the need for Horror's Hand.

After the Underworld Court arrive to finish Boogey's business of banishing Grim forever, Mandy insistently makes them reinstate Grim as the Grim Reaper, because he saved them from a future ruled by Boogey, but also because Numbuh 3 was too much of an optimist to actually reap anyone. In the end, a naked, cut up, future Billy appears before them to warn that if Mandy had used Horror's Hand, she would have taken over the world in two weeks, becoming the Lord of Horror from his time. Grim decides to put the hand in his trunk to ensure that that future never comes to pass. Future Billy eventually goes back to the future to make sure that things were set right.

The credits roll, showing what each character did after the events of the film, such as General Skarr using the hole in his chest to keep birds, Mandy becoming the new Captain of Boogey's ship, Numbuh 3 starting her own Reaper-for-hire service (which results the people laughing at her), Dracula stealing Grim's scythe for use as a golf club, Irwin being bedridden for getting infected with mono and cooties after kissing Mandy, Billy eventually becoming President of the United States and Boogey living in fear ever since his defeat.

The epilogue shows how Billy went back to the future to find that it has not changed as Fred Fredburger has obtained Horror's Hand from Grim's magic trunk and took over the world as the new Lord of Horror, having conquered his fear of running out of nachos.

Cast 
 Grey DeLisle - Mandy / Mandroid / Older Mandy / Milkshakes / Some Kid
 Greg Eagles - Grim / Sperg / Pirate #6
 Richard Steven Horvitz - Billy / Billybot / Harold / Pale Ghoulish Juror / Chippy the Squirrel / Future Billy
 Vanessa Marshall - Irwin / Pirate #5 / Unicorn / Future Irwin
 Maxwell Atoms - I'll Cut You Guy / Pirate #2 / Horrorbot / Burnt Skeleton Guard
 George Ball - Peequay
 Jane Carr - Bride of Frankenstein
 Greg Ellis - Creeper / Horror's Hand / Pirate #3 / Paperboy
 Bart Flynn - Giant Cyclops / Ugly Pirate
 C. H. Greenblatt - Fred Fredburger / Pirate #4
 Jennifer Hale - Gladys
 Dorian Harewood - Older Irwin (voice)
 Phil LaMarr - Space Villain / Glacier of Evil / Dracula / Judge Roy Spleen / Underworld Cop (voice)
 Rachael MacFarlane - 2 Headed Parrot (voice)
 George Segal - Horror
 Armin Shimerman - General Skarr / Pirate #7
 James Silverman - Executioner / Pirate #1
 Lauren Tom - Numbuh 3
 Billy West - Pirate #8 / Miniature Cyclops / Spider Clown Mailman / Beast Master
 Fred Willard - The Boogey Man

Production 
Creating the film was the first time that Maxwell Atoms had created anything with a length of over one hour. That, along with creating the regular season was challenging for him. Boogey Man was chosen as the villain for the film because he was a lesser villain that had a relationship with Grim. This was because Atoms was given the idea to follow a storyline similar to Star Trek II: The Wrath of Khan by a Cartoon Network representative. The role of Numbuh Three was originally supposed to be taken up by an entirely new Grim Reaper character, with Atoms having Pamela Anderson in mind for the character, but was ultimately rejected by the studio's casting department thinking that the actress wasn't marketable enough. Due to lack of time and casting conflicts with the studio wanting high-profile actors, he decided to use Numbuh Two, who is innocent, as a sneak preview of The Grim Adventures of the Kids Next Door, but ended being suggested by Tom Warburton that Numbuh Three be used instead. Atoms also used some Nintendo cameos in the later part of this TV movie, such as when Boogey Man kidnaps Mandy he makes a "warp pipe" appear and its SFX is used when he goes into it.

The title track "Land of the Dead" was written and performed by Voltaire. It is Voltaire's second collaboration for The Grim Adventures of Billy & Mandy, the first being on the episode "Little Rock of Horrors" with the song "BRAINS!". The film's end credits also feature "Boogie Wonderland" by Earth, Wind & Fire. The film is most famous for its original song "Scary-O".

Home media 
The film was released on DVD by Warner Home Video in the United States on April 3, 2007. The DVD contains both anamorphic wide screen and modified full screen versions with 5.1 surround sound and regular stereo sound. Special features include the original "Bully Boogie" episode that Boogey originally debuted in and interviews with the voice actors. As of 2021, the DVD release is the only availability of this movie. Due to music licensing issues, it has yet to be available to stream on iTunes, Amazon Prime, and HBO Max (except in Latin America).

Reception 
The film received generally positive reviews from critics. Dennis Prince of DVD Verdict reviewed the movie saying, "All told, Billy & Mandy's Big Boogey Adventure is a gift from Atoms, and an indulgence of all the goodness and gooeyness that has made the series a top draw on Cartoon Network. Despite the boogers, bare buttocks, and boorish humor, this court finds no real crime has been committed. Case dismissed". MaryAnn Johanson, of The Flick Filospher reviewed the movie saying "'Full-length movie. Full of boogers!' promises the blobby green sticker on the DVD. And it's true. But somehow, the tons of gross-out potty humor manages to be delightfully goofy -- perhaps it's the irresistibly cheerful spin cartoonist Maxwell Atoms puts on his demented twisting of kiddie cartoons" It was nominated for an Annie Award for Best Music in an Animated Television Production. Common Sense Media gave the movie 2/5 stars and is meant for kids over the age of 8 calling it "undeniably gross and just as undeniably funny". DVDverdict.com gave the movie a good review as well.

References

External links 

 
 

Cartoon Network Studios animated films
Cartoon Network television films
The Grim Adventures of Billy & Mandy films
2007 television films
2007 animated films
2007 films
Animated crossover films
Animated films based on animated series
2000s adventure comedy films
2000s children's comedy films
American animated television films
American children's animated comedy films
American children's animated fantasy films
2000s American animated films
Television series about parallel universes
2007 comedy films
Animated films about children